Events from the year 1743 in Scotland.

Incumbents 

 Secretary of State for Scotland: The Marquess of Tweeddale

Law officers 
 Lord Advocate – Robert Craigie
 Solicitor General for Scotland – Robert Dundas, the younger

Judiciary 
 Lord President of the Court of Session – Lord Culloden
 Lord Justice General – Lord Ilay
 Lord Justice Clerk – Lord Milton

Events 
 17 May – approximately 100 men of the 43rd Highland Regiment of Foot (the 'Black Watch') desert while on the march to London; the ringleaders are executed on 18 July in the Tower of London.
 27 June (16 June O.S.) – War of the Austrian Succession: Battle of Dettingen in Bavaria – British forces, including the Royal Scots Greys, the Scots Guards and the Royal Scots Fusiliers, in alliance with those of Hanover and Hesse, defeat the French; King George II of Great Britain (and Elector of Brunswick) leads his own troops, the last reigning British monarch to participate in a battle.
 4 October – Archibald Campbell, Earl of Ilay succeeds his brother as 3rd Duke of Argyll.
 Robert Foulis becomes printer to the University of Glasgow.
 Probable date – the last wolf in Scotland is shot, in Killiecrankie.

Births 
 18 June – Alexander Gordon, 4th Duke of Gordon, born Marquess of Huntly, clan chief (died 1827 in England)
 William Saunders, physician, first President of the Medical and Chirurgical Society of London (died 1817 in England)

Deaths 
 6 May – Andrew Michael Ramsay, Catholic Jacobite scholar (born 1686; died in France)
 4 October – John Campbell, 2nd Duke of Argyll, soldier (born 1678 in England; died in England)

See also 

 Timeline of Scottish history

References 

 
Years of the 18th century in Scotland
Scotland
1740s in Scotland